Karl Stewart (born June 30, 1983) is a Canadian former professional ice hockey player who played in the National Hockey League before finishing his career with the Straubing Tigers of the Deutsche Eishockey Liga (DEL).

Playing career
Born in Aurora, Ontario, Stewart was not selected in the NHL Entry Draft. Stewart signed as a free agent with the Atlanta Thrashers on September 28, 2001. He played with the Plymouth Whalers of the Ontario Hockey League before making his pro debut with the Chicago Wolves in the American Hockey League, Stewart managed to play thirteen games for the Thrashers.

On August 17, 2006, he was traded by the Thrashers with a second round pick to the Anaheim Ducks for Vitaly Vishnevski but before even playing a game, he was claimed off waivers by the Pittsburgh Penguins on September 27, 2006.

After just three games he was claimed off waivers again, this time by the Chicago Blackhawks on October 26, 2006. Stewart managed to gain more ice time and also scored his first NHL goal. Along with this achievement, Stewart was also a fan favorite among the Chicago faithful, gaining respect with his energy and relentless bodychecking. Later in the season, he moved for a fourth time when he was traded by the Blackhawks to the Tampa Bay Lightning for Russian Nikita Alexeev on February 27, 2007.

Stewart spent the majority of the 2007–08 season in the AHL with the Norfolk Admirals, but managed to play nine games for the Lightning. He was signed by the Florida Panthers on October 2, 2008. Stewart spent the 2008–09 season with Panthers affiliate, the Rochester Americans of the AHL.

On April 6, 2009, Stewart signed with Deutsche Eishockey Liga club, Straubing Tigers.

After six seasons with the Tigers, Stewart left as a free agent to initially sign a one-year contract in the Austrian Hockey League with the Vienna Capitals. However two months later, Stewart terminated his contract with the Capitals and opted to end his playing career to take a scouting role within the NHL Central Scouting organization on July 30, 2015.

Career statistics

References

External links
 

1983 births
Living people
Atlanta Thrashers players
Canadian ice hockey centres
Canadian people of Scottish descent
Chicago Blackhawks players
Chicago Wolves players
Sportspeople from Aurora, Ontario
Norfolk Admirals players
Pittsburgh Penguins players
Plymouth Whalers players
Rochester Americans players
Straubing Tigers players
Tampa Bay Lightning players
Ice hockey people from Ontario
Undrafted National Hockey League players
Canadian expatriate ice hockey players in Germany